Piste Oreiller-Killy  is a World Cup downhill ski course in France, at La Daille on Rocher de Bellevarde in Val d'Isere, Savoie. It debuted  in 1966 and is named after ski legends Henri Oreiller and Jean-Claude Killy.

The course is about  down the road from "La face de Bellevarde", an extremely steep course designed by Bernhard Russi for the 1992 Winter Olympics.

Silvano Beltrametti's accident on the course in December 2001 led to safety improvements;  blue lines were introduced in ski competitions, which led the way to the next poles.

Course
Since opening in 1966, it is part of the "Critérium of the First Snow" (Critérium de la première neige), one of the oldest and most prestigious ski races in the world.

It was later named for alpine ski legends Henri Oreiller and Jean-Claude Killy, Olympic champions with strong ties to Val d'Isere.

Part of World Cup since its second season in 1968, it is one of the classic and most common hosts on the circuit for both genders.

It replaced cancelled events from Wengen (1990), Val Gardena (2000), Alta Badia (2000) and Beaver Creek (2001, 2008, 2016, 2020).

The course regularly hosts women's World Cup events; men's races moved to Bellevarde permanently in 2008, except when replacing previously cancelled events.

Sections
 Bosse à Colombin, Plat de la OK, Le Téléphone pleure, Le Carroussel, L'Entrée de la Forêt, La Bosse à Emile, La Compression, La Traversée and L'Usine à Neige.

World Cup

Men

Women

Club5+ 
In 1986, elite Club5 was originally founded by prestigious classic downhill organizers: Kitzbühel, Wengen, Garmisch, Val d’Isère and Val Gardena/Gröden, with goal to bring alpine ski sport on the highest levels possible.

Later over the years other classic longterm organizers joined the now named Club5+: Alta Badia, Cortina, Kranjska Gora, Maribor, Lake Louise, Schladming, Adelboden, Kvitfjell, St.Moritz and Åre.

Fatal accidents
On 9 January 1988, just before the World Cup dowhnill race, tragic accident happened, when a young man who was driving a snowcat crashed with it into the chairlift column and lost his life.

On 8 December 2001, Silvano Beltrametti crashed at full speed at World Cup downhill race under the safety nets outside the course into the tree ending on a wheel chair. A day before he was 3rd in super-G.

References

External links 
 Val d’Isère Ski area valdIsere.com 
 Piste Map – Val d’Isère valdIsere.com 
 History worldcup-valdIsere.com 
 Club des Sports de Val d'Isère valsport.org/

Alpine skiing in France
Skiing in France